Nușfalău ( or Nagyfalu) is a commune located in Sălaj County, Crișana, Romania. It is composed of two villages, Bilghez (Bürgezd) and Nușfalău; Boghiș and Bozieș split off in 2005 to form Boghiș commune.

Sights 
 Reformed Church in Nușfalău, built in the 15th century (1450), historic monument
 Banffy Castle in Nușfalău, built in the 18th century, historic monument
 Lapiș Forest Nature reserve (430,40 ha)

See also 
 Lapiș Forest
 Nușfalău massacre

References

Communes in Sălaj County
Localities in Crișana